Aluminium monochloride, or chloridoaluminium is the metal halide with the formula AlCl.  Aluminum monochloride as a molecule is thermodynamically stable at high temperature and low pressure only. This compound is produced as a step in the Alcan process to smelt aluminium from an aluminium-rich alloy. When the alloy is placed in a reactor that is heated to 1,300 °C and mixed with aluminium trichloride, a gas of aluminium monochloride is produced.

It then disproportionates into aluminium melt and aluminium trichloride upon cooling to 900 °C.

This molecule has been detected in the interstellar medium, where molecules are so dilute that intermolecular collisions are unimportant.

See also
Aluminium monofluoride
Aluminium monobromide
Aluminium monoiodide

References 

Aluminium(I) compounds
Chlorides
Metal halides